Ghena (book), also known as "the book of Ghina' and Moosiqi (music)" is a Persian Feqhi book which has been written by Iran's supreme leader, Seyyed Ali Khamenei. This religious book which is also known as "Darsnameh Ghina'-and-Moosiqi" (i.e. textbook of Qena and Music), includes the text of 76 sessions from the Fiqh sessions of haram (illegal) gains of Seyyed Ali Khamenei in regards to the subject of Ghina' and music.

Meaning (of Ghena)
Ghena or Ghināʾ (in Arabic: الغناء), is attributed to the voice of a human being produced in an undulating pattern in order to create the effect of rapture which is appropriate for gatherings of merrymaking and sin. This is haram (forbidden Islamically) to engage in this kind of singing; in addition to listen to it.

Publication
The Research-Cultural Institute of "Enghelab-e-Eslami" (the Islamic Revolution institute) relating to "the Office for the Preservation and Publication of the Works of Seyyed Ali Khamenei", has published the textbook of Ghena which is including 76 sessions (since 2008-2009). The goal of this publication is to perceive Seyyed-Ali Khamenei's viewpoint and his Feqhi manner on the mentioned subject -- of Ghina'. On the other hand, Arabic article of Khamenei in this field has been published by the institute (of Enghelab-e-Eslami) in the periodical of "Feqhe-Ahlulbayt".

See also

 An Outline of Islamic Thought in the Quran
 Ruhe-Tawhid, Nafye Obudiate GheireKhoda
 A 250 Years Old Person
 Palestine (2011 book)
 Four main books of Biographical-Evaluation

References

 
Ali Khamenei
Shia Islam
Iranian books
Persian-language books
Shia bibliography